Entre a Fé e a Razão is the four studio album by Trazendo a Arca, and the first released by Graça Music. This album had 40 000 copies sold.

Track listing
"Sobre a Terra"
"Acende a Chama"
"Grande Deus"
"Nosso Deus"
"Entre a Fé e a Razão"
"Desceu"
"Casa do Oleiro"
"O Nardo"
"Vale a Pena"
"Quando a Nuvem Move"
"Sal e Luz"

Personnel
Luiz Arcanjo (lead vocals)
André Mattos (drums)
Ronald Fonseca (keyboard)
Deco Rodrigues (bass)
Isaac Ramos (guitar)

References

2010 albums
Trazendo a Arca albums